Captivate Entertainment LLC. is an American film production company, founded by Jeffrey Weiner and Ben Smith in 2009. It has a first-look deal with Universal Studios and it is based on the Universal Studios Backlot in Universal City, California. The company is best known for managing the movie rights of Robert Ludlum's books  and producing the 2012 film The Bourne Legacy starring Jeremy Renner, Rachel Weisz and Edward Norton.

History 
Captivate Entertainment was started in 2009 by Jeffrey Wiener, the executor of the Robert Ludlum Estate and Ben Smith, the veteran ICM Partners agent handling Ludlum's works at the Agency. After the successful The Bourne Ultimatum, writer Paul Zetumer was drafted by Universal and Captivate to script a fourth installment of the Bourne Identity franchise which would star Matt Damon and be directed by Paul Greengrass. However, following a dispute between Greengrass and the studio, Damon said he wouldn't make another without his director. Captivate Entertainment and Universal instead filled the gap with the spinoff film The Bourne Legacy, which Tony Gilroy wrote and directed.

Filmography

Feature films 
Released films

Films in development

Television

References

Film production companies of the United States